Melby Parish is a parish in the Diocese of Helsingør in Halsnæs Municipality, Denmark. The parish contains the towns of Liseleje and Melby.

References 

Halsnæs Municipality
Parishes of Denmark